Darren Cave (born 5 April 1987) is a retired professional rugby union player who played centre for Ulster in the Pro14 and European Rugby Champions Cup.

A real attacking talent, Cave was another young player who has come up through the Ulster Academy system and upgraded his development contract to a full contract with Ulster ahead of the start of the 2008–09 season.

He is a strong runner and tackling centre who has made a rapid progression at international level, having helped Ireland win the Grand Slam during 2007 Six Nations Under 20s Championship, starred in Ireland's Rugby World Cup Sevens qualification and he has represented Ireland 'A' as they won the 2009 Churchill Cup.

Ulster Rugby
In 2010/11 Cave struggled with injuries but returned towards the end of the season and scored some vital tries as Ulster reached the quarter-finals of the Heineken Cup and semi-finals of the Magners League. Cave showed excellent form on his return to action but picked up another injury in early 2012, just as he looked likely to be included in Ireland's Six Nations squad. He made another magnificent comeback as Ulster made the Heineken Cup final for just the second time in their history, but they lost to Leinster in the 2012 Heineken Cup Final, 42-14.

Cave agreed a new two-year deal with Ulster in December 2012, keeping him at the Irish province until the summer of 2015. He told Ulster's website: "Signing this new contract was probably the easiest decision that I have ever made in my life, especially at a time when the team have just won 12 competitive matches in a row. I honestly think that Ulster are going to win something between now and the summer of 2015 and I would never forgive myself if I wasn't around to be a part of that."

In the 2012/13 campaign, Cave was ever-present as Ulster reached the final of the PRO12 and recorded a series of notable firsts including winning in France and beating every Welsh region in Wales. Cave scored five tries the following season and was a stand-out player for the province as Ulster won all six of their Heineken Cup Pool matches and reached the PRO12 Play Off. His form was rewarded with a place on the Ireland tour to Argentina where he played in both test matches.

Cave retired from rugby union at the end of the 2018–19 season.

International career
Cave was included in Ireland's extended 2009 Six Nations squad and won his first international cap against Canada in May 2009. His form was recognised with an international call up for the summer tour to New Zealand in June 2012 where he won his third cap and he then scored a brilliant individual try for an Ireland XV side that played Fiji at Thomond Park on November 17, 2012.

Cave was named in the Ireland squad for their 2013 US and Canada summer tour and played in both matches, scoring a try vs Canada match.

In the summer of 2014 Cave was included in the following summer tour and played twice against Argentina. After initially not been selected for the Autumn International, he was recalled by Joe Schmidt and made his eighth appearance in the comprehensive 49-7 victory over Georgia on Sunday 16 November 2014.

References

External links
Ulster Profile
Pro14 Profile

1987 births
Living people
Irish rugby union players
Ireland international rugby union players
Ulster Rugby players
Belfast Harlequins rugby union players
People educated at Sullivan Upper School
People from Holywood, County Down
Ireland Wolfhounds international rugby union players
Ireland international rugby sevens players
Irish rugby sevens players
Rugby union centres